Morro Bay High School is a four-year public high school located in the city of Morro Bay along the coast of San Luis Obispo County, California, United States.

Students of the school are typically residents of Morro Bay, Los Osos (to the south), and Cayucos (to the north). On average, enrollment ranges from 800 to 900 students a year. The school is roughly 60 meters from the beach (.04 mile) and 228 meters (.14 mile) from the Pacific Ocean.

History 
Morro Bay High School was first conceived in 1956 when the city voted bonds for its construction, winning by a ratio of four to one. The school was completed in 1959. Initially, the school had served 5 grades throughout the late 60s: 7th Grade, 8th Grade, 9th Grade, 10th Grade, and 11th Grade. Around the late to early 70s the school later followed the common structure of an "American four-year high school".

Health hazards 
Being located right next to the ocean, the quad has faced multiple problems regarding seagulls. Problems such as noise pollution, defecation in the quad and outside areas, and misplaced trash have been common complaints in the last decade. According to faculty, the school had been power washed two times before 2016. Since 2017, the school has hired a "birdman" to use predatory birds (hawks, owls, and falcons) to patrol the school, acting as a deterrent to the seagulls. As of now, this has proved to be effective in clearing the sky of seagulls and keeping the ground clean.

Measure D 
In 2014 a $177 million bond was passed to renovate infrastructure of schools in SLCUSD. Since 2016, the school has gone through heavy construction with renovations such as renovation of the auto shop, a new pool, student services building (new office), all-weather track, STEAM complex (J Wing Renovation), and New Band and Agriculture Shop Classroom. Current renovations have added up to around $12 million. The school anticipates $33 more million worth of construction, with a remodeled cafeteria/multipurpose room, renovation to the quad, renovation of the classrooms, and restoration of the old gym.

Football controversy 

On October 24th, David Kelly, who was a football coach, received backlash from the community and school administration after calling one of his football players "a homosexual". According to principal Dr. Kyle Pruitt, he was fired as head coach on the grounds of using "unacceptable verbal interaction that was insensitive to the LGBTQ community between a coach/teacher and a student-athlete on our campus". However, the position of school officials for the firing remains unclear. Though he is banned from coaching football, he currently still attains his position as a history teacher. This event had seen a reaction from the football team, local LGBT groups, the school community, and administration. 

Key accounts and disputes

Primary accounts of the incident can be attributed to the football players themselves, who that had confirmed him saying these words. According to Rocky Brebes, after "one junior varsity player kept sitting in the locker room and smiling at the head coach," Kelly got mad at the player, telling him "to stop looking at him like a homosexual and to get the hell to practice." After this occurrence, it escalated quickly as the junior then ran out of the locker room, where many students from an athletics class witnessed him screaming and cursing at Kelly from a distance for over five minutes.

Reactions from local LGBT groups

According to major local media outlet KSBY, upon hearing of the situation, local LGBT groups have taken it upon themselves to claim the situation as "marginalizing toward certain groups". According to KSBY, "GALA (Gay and Lesbian Alliance of the Central Coast) and 13 other nonprofits" have asked "to suspend Kelley from teaching." The President of the GALA Ryan Duclos has also made unverified claims that "GALA has received phone calls from students who tell similar stories" relating to "uncomfortable comments about gay people on multiple occasions" from Kelly. Furthermore, people on the GALA Facebook page has reportedly made similarly structured and unverified claims.

Reaction from the football team

Many of the players of the football team had instigated that the situation was one taken advantage of by the school, in simple terms a ploy. Known for having performed poorly in football the past three years, the football team assumed that the losing record of Morro Bay as of recently played a "factor" in his firing. This is known as the Morro Bay varsity team had finished the 2018 season 1-9 over and 0-5 (win/loss) in Ocean League. Students on the football team, being primary witnesses to the situation, have believed that the performance of the football team under Coach Kelly had played apart of his firing. Despite the principal labeling the situation as one that was "hate speech", it is known that the school officials had not clearly defined their actually position of why they had fired him. In response to the school's administration, many of the players have voiced their support of the coach with player Rocky Brebes stating "I love Coach Kelley, and so does every single person on our varsity team." Expressing the football team's relation to the coach Bebes empathized, "He was more than a coach to us. He became family, and he always had our back. Whenever we were hungry, he would always get us food. If we ever needed clothes, he would always find us some clothes. Whenever we needed help in school because of bad grades or any of that, he would always find us support." Furthermore, Jim Pugh, the father of one of his players expressed sympathy, saying, “He is human and made a mistake. He is suffering, as are his boys. He was being disrespected by a young man who thinks telling an adult to f*** off is acceptable. He is a good man who has nurtured and loved all of those boys.”

Reactions from the school's LGBT community

Despite claims by the local LGBT community within the region calling for the completely removal of Kelly's teaching position, according to the school's primary news outlet, comments from the school's very own LGBT group are more moderate in their reaction. According to a school reporter Adam Rainbolt, out of the six anonymous members of the then-existing LGBT community (members of the SAGA club), two have reported to not know about this event, two "were somewhat unclear about what had occurred", whereas the remaining two had voiced some distaste but sympathy despite his actions. Albeit, one noted “what he said was offensive to a lot of people” while the other shared "they think that a coach should be supportive of everyone", in response to the situation having said that, to an extent, the actions of the school were “harsh”. One of them had also stated, "it was surprising because I know him as such a calm, caring person for his students and his team, but I know he has acted out of anger in the past."

Demographics 
In 2019, total minority enrollment was 35%, and 31% of students are considered to be economically disadvantaged.

Clubs 

 Art Club
 AVID
 Biobuilders (BioTech)
 Dungeons and Dragons club
 FCA (Fellowship of Christian Athletes)
 FFA (Future Farmers of America)
 FNL (Friday Night Live)
 Environmental Club
 Interact 
 Kindness Club
 MBHS Kayaking Club
 MBHS Theatre Arts
 Mock Trial
 Music History Club
 Power Lifting Club
 S.A.G.A (Sexuality and Gender Acceptance)
 Society of Women Engineers
 Students for Social Justice
 Surf
 Swing Dancing Club
 Tabletop RPG Club
 Underwater Robotics
 VEX Robotics Club

Note: these are the clubs as of 2020

Sports 

Note: These are the sports running currently as of 2020

Sports leagues
Since 2018, Morro Bay High School has competed in the Central Coast Athletic Association (CCAA), a conference affiliated with the CIF Central Section. The CCAA places each team by sport and gender into one of its two constituent leagues — the upper Mountain League and the lower Ocean League — based on performance. Until the 2017–18 school year, MBHS and neighboring Central Coast schools were part of the CIF Southern Section, a highly competitive grouping whose footprint included around 600 schools stretching from south of Los Angeles to northern San Luis Obispo County.

Cross country 
Morro Bay hosts a Cross Country Invitational in September yearly, attended by over 30 schools with an attendance of around 900 runners overall. The course is currently 2.7 miles which goes through the school and nearby beach, 1 mile of the 2.7 mile course going through soft sand. The event also features a shorter 2 mile course. The course was currently changed to remove a portion that goes through an area that is near a snowy plover preservation.

Recent changes 
Preceding the shift to a Central Section, the varsity team was required to get top in League in order to proceed in Southern League. After League, it was required to get through both Prelims and Finals, where it was required to finish 6th or above out of 12 in order to get to state. Now all teams in the league can get to Finals which has been reduced to one CIF Finals match (finish 6th or above out of 12) in order to proceed to state. This has been done due to the smaller nature of the Central Section compared to the Southern Section.

Notable achievements 
Morro Bay had notably been historically dominant in league between the 1980s and early 2010s, winning over 20 league titles in the now-dissolved Los Padres League, going to CIF events more than 25 times in the highly competitive Southern Section, and going to state tournaments over 20 times.

Morro Bay High School has been referenced in the 2015 American sports drama film McFarland, USA in a scene in which Palo Alto, McFarland, and another school compete. Contrary to popular belief, Morro Bay was a historical rival to McFarland in cross country in state meets prior to the 2000s, more so than Palo Alto, having met McFarland at state over 15 times.

In 1993, Morro Bay lost to McFarland by 2 points. In 1994, Morro Bay tied with McFarland for first but lost due to a tiebreaker decided by the 6th runner. MBHS then lost first place again the next year for state to McFarland, finishing second. Throughout the late '80s, '90s, and 2000s, both schools had consistently met at the state competition, placing above or below each other in Division VI.

The school, historically in the Southern Section, has gone to CIF State XC in 1982, 1983, 1984, 1985, 1990, 1991, 1992, 1993, 1994, 1995, 1997, 1998, 2000, 2003, 2004, 2004, 2006, 2008, 2009 and 2013.

Wrestling
Morro Bay High School has notably hosted the Sam Boyd California Invitational Tournament, one of the biggest wrestling tournaments in California, hosting over 90 teams and over 980 wrestlers from California and out-of-state Nevada annually. The wrestling team has shown to be a top contender in this event notably finishing 7th out of 90 schools in 2019.

Academic reputation
Morro Bay High School as of 2019 is ranked the 649th out of 2,494 high schools in California (4,424th nationally) by U.S News's metric. In October 2017, it was ranked the 475th best high school in California (2,432nd nationally) by Newsweek. It was previously ranked the 432nd best High School in the 2011 Newsweek article titled "America's Best High Schools",  It was previously ranked the 432nd best High School in the 2011 Newsweek article titled "America's Best High Schools", and was reported to have the highest average SAT score (2245 out of 2400) amongst these schools. The LA Times, however, reported that the average SAT score at the school was 1649.

In 2006, Morro Bay High School was named a National Blue Ribbon School by the U.S. Department of Education.

In 2005 and 2009 and 2013, Morro Bay High School was accredited as a California Distinguished School by WASC.

The graduation rate at the school is 95% according to USnews.

References

External links

High schools in San Luis Obispo County, California
Public high schools in California
Morro Bay
1956 establishments in California